Paul Frew (born 20 September 1974) is a Unionist politician from Northern Ireland representing the Democratic Unionist Party (DUP). Frew served as Minister for the Economy from June to July 2021. He has been a Member of the Legislative Assembly (MLA) for North Antrim since 2010.

He was elected at the 2005 local elections to Ballymena Borough Council.

In 2010, he replaced Ian Paisley, Jr as a Member of the Northern Ireland Assembly for North Antrim.

A native of Kells, he is an electrician by trade and didn't go to third-level education, commenting in one interview "my university was the building sites of Belfast".

He served in the Royal Irish Regiment.

He joined the DUP in 2000 and first stood for office in local government in 2005. He plays the spoons.

References

1974 births
Living people
People from Broughshane
Democratic Unionist Party MLAs
Members of Ballymena Borough Council
Northern Ireland MLAs 2007–2011
Northern Ireland MLAs 2011–2016
Northern Ireland MLAs 2016–2017
Northern Ireland MLAs 2017–2022